Mount Roland is the name of several mountains:

Mount Roland Conservation Area in Tasmania, Australia
Mount Roland (Antarctica)